A Letter from Greenland, stylised as A letter from Greenland, is the fourth studio album by S.E.S., released on December 30, 2000, by S.M. Entertainment and Avex Asia. It has sold approximately 650,000 copies. The only two singles from the record were "감싸안으며 (Show Me Your Love)," a Korean cover of Misia's debut single "Tsutsumikomu Yō ni...", and "Be Natural", with the latter was later re-recorded by girl group Red Velvet as their second digital single in October 2014.

Track listing

Accolades

External links 
  S.E.S.' Official Site
  SM Entertainment's Official Site

2000 albums
S.E.S. (group) albums
SM Entertainment albums